Julián Vara López (born 17 November 1983) is a Spanish retired footballer who played as a right midfielder.

Football career
Vara was born in Las Rozas de Madrid, Community of Madrid. A product of Atlético Madrid's youth academy, he spent most of his spell there with the reserves, only appearing twice for the first team: in rounds #37 and #38 of the 2005–06 season, he played ten minutes against Valencia CF and Real Betis, both ending in 1–1 La Liga draws.

In the 2007–08 campaign, Vara also served a loan to RC Celta de Vigo in the second division, being rarely used. After another spell in that tier (still owned by Atlético) with SD Huesca, he resumed his career in the lower levels of his country, scoring five goals as AD Alcorcón promoted to division two for the first time ever in 2010.

References

External links

1983 births
Living people
Spanish footballers
Footballers from the Community of Madrid
Association football midfielders
La Liga players
Segunda División players
Segunda División B players
Tercera División players
Atlético Madrid B players
Las Rozas CF players
Atlético Madrid footballers
RC Celta de Vigo players
SD Huesca footballers
AD Alcorcón footballers
Football League (Greece) players
Ilioupoli F.C. players
Spanish expatriate footballers
Expatriate footballers in Greece